Taking The Next Step is a British/Irish TV programme on CBBC. It is a competition of young dancers competing for a cameo on The Next Step, a teenage Canadian dance drama. The show is presented by Lindsey Russell and Sam and Mark. The three judges are Kimberly Wyatt, Jonny Labey and Marlon ‘Swoosh’ Wallen.

BBC children's television shows
British teen drama television series
The Next Step (2013 TV series)
Dance television shows